Andreas Maurer was the defending champion, but lost in the semifinals to Joakim Nyström.

Nyström won the title by defeating Kent Carlsson 6–1, 6–1 in the final.

Seeds

Draw

Finals

Top half

Bottom half

References

External links
 Official results archive (ATP)
 Official results archive (ITF)

Madrid Tennis Grand Prix
1986 Grand Prix (tennis)